Pyrgos is a city in the northwestern Peloponnese, Greece, capital of the regional unit of Elis and the seat of the Municipality of Pyrgos. The city is located in the middle of a plain,  from the Ionian Sea. The population of the town Pyrgos is 25,180, and of the municipality 47,995 (2011).

Historical population

Municipality

The municipality Pyrgos was formed during the 2011 local government reform by the merger of the following 4 former municipalities, that became municipal units:
Iardanos
Oleni
Pyrgos
Volakas

The municipality has an area of 456.610 km2, the municipal unit 170.866 km2.

Subdivisions
The municipal unit of Pyrgos is divided into the following communities (settlements within the communities given in brackets):
Pyrgos (Pyrgos, Anthopyrgos, Kavasilakia, Lampeti, Syntriada, Tragano)
Agios Georgios
Agios Ilias (Agios Ilias, Pyrgi, Stamatelaiika)
Agios Ioannis (Agios Ioannis, Kyani Akti, Palatas, Tragano)
Ampelonas (Ampelonas, Kouzouli, Rozeika)
Elaionas (Elaionas, Vytinaiika)
Granitsaiika (Granitsaiika, Kavouri)
Katakolo (Katakolo, Agios Andreas)
Koliri (Koliri, Kolireikes Paragkes)
Korakochori (Korakochori, Agios Andreas, Kallithea, Bouka)
Lasteika (Lasteika, Itia)
Leventochori
Myrtia
Palaiovarvasaina (Palaiovarvasaina, Agios Georgios, Kampos)
Salmoni (Salmoni, Alfeios)
Skafidia (Skafidia, Kalakaiika, Moni Skafidias, Patronikoleika)
Skourochori (Skourochori, Kato Kavouri)
Varvasaina (Varvasaina, Kato Varvasaina)
Vytinaiika

History

History of the name 

In the 1510s, during Ottoman rule over Greece, a villager from Kalavryta decided to move and reform the area of Pyrgos which up until then was uncultivated. During this reformation he found in a well a large amount of gold ancient coins which he delivered to the Sultan as the rightful owner. The Sultan, Selim I (1470-1520), in order to honor his integrity named him ruler of the region (1512) and gave him a great acreage expanding from Alfeios river until the village Agios Ioannis which is located near Katakolo (the main port of the Elis region). This area was encompassing today's Pyrgos and was uninhabited. According to the stories the new ruler built a great tower (Πύργος, pyrgos in Greek) on a hill in order to supervise his fields and his flocks. This was the first settlement of the area.

Climate
Pyrgos has a hot-summer mediterranean climate (Köppen climate classification Csa) with hot and dry summers and rainy winters with generally mild temperatures. Annual precipitation is sizeable, above 900 mm, and it peaks in late autumn.

Transportation

Pyrgos has a train station with regular trains to the port of Katakolo and Olympia. Service on the line from Patras to Kalamata via Pyrgos has been suspended in 2011. Pyrgos has a bus terminal, served by KTEL Ileias, with regular buses for the regional routes to most places in Elis as well as for intercity routes to Athens and to larger cities such as Patras, Kalamata, Ioannina and Thessaloniki. The Greek National Road 9 connects Pyrgos with Patras and Kyparissia, the Greek National Road 74 run from Pyrgos to Tripoli via Olympia. The nearest airport is located in Andravida near the town of Amaliada but it is served for military operations only. However, there are plans to open passenger operations in the next years. The alternative airports for passenger operations are Araxos airport. located in the province of Aichaia about 60 km or Kalamata Captain Vasilios Constatakopoulos airport, in Messinia province near Kalamata about 120 km from the city.

Education
Department of Museum Studies of the university of Patras based in the city.

Sporting teams
Paniliakos F.C. (played last in the first division during the 2003–2004 season)

Notable people

Andreas Avgerinos (1820–1895), politician
Petros Avgerinos (19th century), politician, mayor of Pyrgos
Nakis Avgerinos (1911–2001), politician
Giorgos Karagounis (1977–), footballer
Kostas Kazakos (1935–2022), actor and politician
George Pavlopoulos (1924–2008), poet
Takis Sinopoulos (1917–1981), poet
Stephanos Stephanopoulos (1898–1982), politician and President of the Hellenic Republic 
Theodoros Xydis, (1909–1985), poet and essayist.
Sakis Karagiorgas (1930–1985), professor in Panteion University

See also
List of settlements in Elis

References

External links

 
Populated places in Elis
Greek prefectural capitals
Municipalities of Western Greece
1512 establishments in Europe